Ali Beyglu (also Romanized as ‘Alī Beyglū) is a village in Kandovan Rural District, Kandovan District, Meyaneh County, East Azerbaijan Province, Iran. At the 2006 census, its population was 21, in 7 families.

References 

Populated places in Meyaneh County